Ralph Tregrision was Dean of Exeter between 1385 and 1415.

Notes

Deans of Exeter